The Great Northern Railway (GNR) Class O2 was a class of three-cylinder 2-8-0 steam locomotives designed by Nigel Gresley for freight work and built by the GNR from 1921.  Further examples were built by the London and North Eastern Railway (LNER) from 1924.

Sub-classes
The LNER created four subclasses: 

 O2/1, Introduced 1921. Development of experimental Gresley GNR 3-cylinder locomotive (LNER 3921). Subsequently rebuilt with side-window cab and reduced boiler mountings.
 O2/2, Introduced 1924. Development of O2/1 with detail differences.
 O2/3, Introduced 1932. Development of O2/2 with side-window cab and reduced boiler mountings.
 O2/4, Introduced 1943. Rebuilt with 100A (B1 type) boiler and smokebox extended backwards.

GNR
The first models of this class were designed and built under GNR ownership, the first locomotive, 461, was built in May 1918. A batch of ten further O2s was built by the North British Locomotive Co. in 1921.

LNER

Fifteen more O2s were built immediately after the Grouping in 1923. Sixteen more were delivered in 1932 and 1933. Wartime requirements led to the construction of 25 from 1942 to 43 in three batches.

British Railways

All 67 locomotives passed to British Railways (BR) in 1948 and were given BR Numbers 63921-63987, but 63921 (which was the prototype 461, LNER 3921) was quickly scrapped. They served all across the former LNER from Stratford through East Anglia into the East Midlands, primarily hauling coal and iron ore trains. By winter 1955/56, they had all gravitated to Doncaster (36A - 35 locomotives), Grantham (35B - 14 locomotives) and Retford (36E - 17 locomotives). By winter 1962, they were down to 52 locomotives still in much the same locations, the following having been scrapped: 63929/34/44/47/50-55/57-59/70.

By the end of 1963, all members of the class had been scrapped.

Gallery

References

 British Railways Locomotives Combined Volume Winter 1955/56, part 4, p. 32, and the locoshed section, p. 71.
 British Railways Locomotives Combined Volume 11/62, p. 144

External links 

 LNER encyclopedia

O2
2-8-0 locomotives
1′D h3 locomotives
Railway locomotives introduced in 1921
Scrapped locomotives
NBL locomotives
Standard gauge steam locomotives of Great Britain
Freight locomotives